Knobelsdorff is a surname. Notable people with the surname include:

Alexander von Knobelsdorff (1723–1799), Prussian general of the War of the First Coalition 
Elisabeth von Knobelsdorff (1877–1959), German engineer and architect
Georg Wenzeslaus von Knobelsdorff (1699–1753), Prussian painter and architect
Konstantin Schmidt von Knobelsdorf (1860–1936), German general and chief-of-staff of World War I
Otto von Knobelsdorff (1886–1966), German panzer general of World War II
Manfred von Knobelsdorff (1892–1965), SS officer

Surnames
German-language surnames